Live at the Palace Theatre is a live album by Seven Nations, released in 2001.

Track listing
Piper's Wedding
God
King of Oblivion
This Season
Iain's Jig/West Mabou Reel/Itchy Fingers/Clumsy Lover 
All You People
Under the Milky Way
O'er the Moor and Among the Heather/Larry/Gail/Martin Rochford's/Cape Breton Symphony's Welcome to the Shetland Islands/Jig in D/Jenny's Chickens
Amy's Reel/Kelsey's Wee Reel/A Skyedance Reel/Paddy's Leather Breeches/Malts on the Optics/Kelsae Brig
Twelve/The Foxhunter's Waltz
Bog a Lochan
Big Dog
Amazing Grace
Our Day Will Come

Seven Nations (band) albums
2001 live albums